Ifeda is a genus of moths, belonging to the family Batrachedridae.

Selected species
Ifeda perobtusa (Meyrick, 1922)

References

Batrachedridae
Moth genera